Didymochlaena is a genus of fern with only one species, Didymochlaena truncatula, also known under the synonym Didymochlaena sinuosa. In the Pteridophyte Phylogeny Group classification of 2016 (PPG I), it is the only genus in the family Didymochlaenaceae. Alternatively, the family may be placed in a very broadly defined family Polypodiaceae sensu lato as the subfamily Didymochlaenoideae.  It is commonly grown as a house plant, and is sometimes known as the mahogany maidenhair.

Species 
 Didymochlaena attenuata (Bonap. 1917) Zhang & Shang 2020
 Didymochlaena bipinnatipartita (Bonap. 1925) Zhang & Shang 2020
 Didymochlaena deltoidea Zhang & Shang 2020
 Didymochlaena dimidiata Kunze 1844
 †Didymochlaena freyeri (Unger 1852) von Ettingshausen 1870
 Didymochlaena fijiensis Zhang & Shang 2021
 Didymochlaena lunulata Desvaux 1827
 Didymochlaena madagascariensis Zhang & Shang 2020
 Didymochlaena oceanica (Rosenstock 1908) Zhang & Shang 2021
 Didymochlaena philippensis Zhang & Shang 2021
 Didymochlaena pulcherrima Herter 1940
 Didymochlaena punctata Zhang & Shang 2021
 Didymochlaena sinuosa Desvaux 1811
 Didymochlaena solomonensis Zhang & Shang 2021
 Didymochlaena spinulosa (Brause 1910) Zhang & Shang 2020
 Didymochlaena truncatula (Swartz 1801) Smith 1841

Phylogeny

References

Polypodiales
House plants
Monotypic fern genera